Jack C. Jackson Sr. (born September 14, 1933) is an American politician who served in the Arizona Senate and Arizona House of Representatives. He is a Navajo. He is the father of Jack Jackson Jr., also a state politician in Arizona.

References

1933 births
Living people
People from Coconino County, Arizona
Educators from Arizona
Ranchers from Arizona
Democratic Party members of the Arizona House of Representatives
Democratic Party Arizona state senators
Native American state legislators in Arizona
20th-century American politicians
21st-century American politicians
People from Window Rock, Arizona